Moore Kingston Smith is an accountancy firm located in the United Kingdom. The firm has six offices in London and south-east and is the London member of the Moore Global Network. In 2020 the Moore UK network ranked 13th in the list of Accountancy Age magazine's "UK Top 50 accountancy firms".

History
The firm was formed in 1923 with the amalgamation of Herbert Kingston and George Alan Smith. Michael Snyder joined the company as a trainee in 1968 and became Managing Partner in 1979. He played a leadership role in the company, becoming Senior Partner in 1990. He stepped down from the board in 2016, but was retained as a consultant. Martin Muirhead succeeded him as Senior Partner in 2016, while Maureen Penfold became Managing Partner.

Moore Kingston Smith was a founding member of Kingston Sorel International (KSi), which became Morison KSi in 2016, an international association of independent accountancy firms. In 2019, Moore Kingston Smith left Morison KSi and joined Moore Global. In 2021 Moore Kingston Smith acquired the Audit and Accounting business of Frank Hirth, an accountancy and tax firm.

In 2021, Martin Muirhead retired from his role as Senior Partner. Graham Tyler was appointed Chairman of the firm, alongside Maureen Penfold as Managing Partner.

References

External links

Accounting firms of the United Kingdom
Companies based in the London Borough of Islington